Mera  is a fictional superheroine and warrior appearing in American comic books published by DC Comics. Created by Jack Miller and Nick Cardy, the character first appeared in Aquaman #11 (September 1963).

Originally portrayed as a supporting character to her husband, the superhero Aquaman, possessing the formidable hydrokinetic power to create and control water, modern writers have given greater emphasis to her superhuman physical strength. In recent years, Mera has featured as a member of DC Comics' flagship superhero team, the Justice League. Queen Mera's earlier storylines have also portrayed her mental breakdown, as she was faced with crippling loss. The stories explored her attempts at coping with lasting anger and rage. More recent storylines have explored her approach to rulership in comparison to her husband.

The character has been adapted substantially in various media, most notably featured in the DC Extended Universe. Actress Amber Heard portrayed Mera in Justice League and its director's cut, reprised the role in Aquaman and will return in Aquaman and the Lost Kingdom. The character has also been adapted in the Young Justice television series.

Publication history
Queen Mera's Silver Age debut in Aquaman #11 (September 1963) set her place of origin as the mysterious "Dimension Aqua". Aquaman and Mera were married in the first on-camera superhero wedding in comic book history, in Aquaman #18 (Dec 1964).

During the 2011 "Brightest Day" storyline, Dimension Aqua was revealed to be the extradimensional penal colony known formally as Xebel, a place of exile for an ancient faction of Atlantean people, banished along with their descendants after one of the many civil wars of the submerged Atlantis.

Fictional character biography
Mera is the former Queen of Dimension Aqua, Queen of Atlantis, and wife of DC Comics superhero Aquaman. Mera also has a twin sister named Hila.

In her first chronological appearance, Mera is shown to be fleeing the criminal Leron, who seized control of her kingdom, when she arrives on Earth and meets Aquaman and Aqualad, who vows to help her. Leron captures them, imprisoning Aquaman and Mera in Dimension Aqua. Aided by the water spirit known as Quisp, Aquaman manages to free Mera and defeats Leron. Mera abdicates the throne of Xebel to Queen V'lana and returns to Atlantis to marry Aquaman. Soon after, they had a son named Arthur Curry, Jr., also known as Aquababy.

A few years later, Black Manta kidnapped Aquababy and trapped him inside a translucent tank designed to suffocate him. Vulko sends Mera, desperate to save her son, on an ambitious crusade to her homeworld to find the scientist Xebel, who has the components for a special healing device that could save her son. When she arrives, she discovers that her kingdom has been taken over by the traitorous Leron, who has taken Xebel hostage, casting him and the artifacts into the Great Pit. Mera braves the pit and defeats Leron and his elemental monsters to retrieve the device. Sadly, she returns to Atlantis too late, finding her son dead.

Although their son's death created a rift between Aquaman and Mera, they tried relocating to a flooded city on the East Coast to start a new life together. It was during this time that Aquaman left to reform the Justice League in Detroit. Becoming more unstable with grief, Mera was committed to an asylum in Atlantis. Shortly afterward an alien force of sentient giant jellyfish took control of the city. During Aquaman's battle to free them, Mera escapes and savagely attacks him, blaming his "weak genes" for their son's death.

While defending himself, he accidentally pushes her onto an upturned piece of metal, impaling her. Believing her dead, he has her placed inside a coffin and taken to the royal palace. However, she survived, due to her alien physiology. Rising from her coffin, she bitterly reminds Aquaman how little he really knew of her. No longer seeing any reason to remain on Earth, Mera leaves Atlantis and returns to Dimension Aqua.

Return of the Queen
During Peter David's Aquaman run in the 1990s, Mera is revealed to be in the hellish dimension called the Netherworld, where she is brainwashed by Thanatos, an old enemy of her husband. Time passes differently in the Netherworld and she has apparently had a second son whom she refers to as only "AJ". AJ appears to be about 8–10 years old and it is not known if his father is Aquaman or Thanatos.

Eventually, Mera and AJ break free of Thanatos' control but find that they cannot stay on Earth due to AJ's accelerated aging. Mera and AJ again leave Earth for parts unknown. When next shown later in the series, Mera and AJ are on Oceanid, a water world that is being exploited by aliens for its resources. Mera and AJ team up with Aquaman to defeat the aliens and Mera chooses to stay with her former husband in Atlantis, while AJ remains behind on Oceanid to act as its protector and champion, assuming the role of Aquaman.

Mera and Arthur eventually reconcile, living in Atlantis and continuing to have adventures together, including a trip to Skartaris, where they team up with Travis Morgan, The Warlord. They appear to form a true royal family along with Tempest (Garth of Shayeris) and his wife, Dolphin (Aquaman's former lover). Mera participates in the delivery of Garth and Dolphin's son, Cerdian, during this peaceful time. Unfortunately, the Aqua-family's happiness is cut short due to the events depicted in DC's "Obsidian Age", Infinite Crisis, and "One Year Later" storylines. Arthur's attempts to save Atlantis from destruction by transporting it back into the distant past results in the people of Atlantis suffering fifteen years of slavery, during which time Mera serves as their de facto leader and source of hope. When Atlantis is returned to the present, Mera is duty-bound as queen regent to declare him an enemy of Atlantis and order him to stand trial for treason.

Following these events, Mera is shown leading a rebel faction in the rebuilding of Atlantis, which was destroyed by the Spectre in Infinite Crisis. Mera appears in the Aquaman: Sword of Atlantis series during which Aquaman (having been transformed into the Dweller of the Depths during DC's World War III mini-series) appears to perish. Members of the JLA visit Atlantis to give their condolences and Mera is not referenced in DC comics until the "Prelude to Blackest Night" story in Titans #15, where it is revealed that she is in mourning for Arthur. This story also reveals that Dolphin and Cerdian died during the destruction of Atlantis.

"Blackest Night"

In the "Blackest Night" storyline, at the request of Tempest, Mera reluctantly allows Aquaman's remains to be returned to Atlantis. Before they can do so, they are attacked by Aquaman, Tula, and Dolphin who have been reanimated as Black Lanterns. Mera and Tempest battle them but are overwhelmed by their power. Tempest is killed by Tula and summarily transformed into a Black Lantern as well. An angry Mera manages to escape and flees to the Hall of Justice. She sends out a distress signal, and Firestorm (Jason and Gehenna) come to her aid.

She reveals that she was able to evade the Black Lanterns by keeping her emotions in check. The Black Lantern Justice League attacks the group. The Atom helps the heroes escape via a phone line. The Flash tells Atom and Mera that they are the Justice League now. Atom and Mera meet up with the Justice Society who are battling Black Lanterns. The reanimated Jean Loring uses Atom's own technology to shrink Mera, Atom, and herself.

They fall into the freshly killed Damage's ring. As Mera and Atom battle Loring inside the black ring, Loring reveals Nekron's plan. Deadman witnesses their battle and plans to rescue Mera and Atom from Loring. Deadman saves Mera and Atom by briefly possessing Loring, allowing Mera and Atom to escape and join the heroes against Nekron and his army. Fuming after battling and being nearly killed by a ruthlessly savage Black Lantern-powered Wonder Woman, an angry Mera is chosen as a deputy officer of the Red Lantern Corps to be more effective against Nekron's forces.

Shortly after, Mera, now rampaging in a frenzy, encounters Wonder Woman again, who had been transformed into a Star Sapphire by a duplicate of Carol Ferris' ring, and attacks her. During the fight, their two rings interface with each other, the violet light giving Mera some measure of control over her new-found savagery and provides Wonder Woman with an insight into the reasons for Mera's rage. Mera is then approached once again by Aquaman, who now has the reanimated corpse of their child. Aquaman attempts to use their son against her, but Mera states, "I never wanted children," and destroys the Black Lantern version of Arthur, Jr. The power of her anger even impresses Atrocitus. She then shows a desire to hunt down Aquaman and destroy him. Following Nekron's destruction, Aquaman is restored to life by the white light. The sight of Arthur alive calms Mera down, breaking her connection to the red ring and causing her to go into cardiac arrest. Carol and Saint Walker use their combined lights to restore her to life, and she tearfully reunites with Aquaman.

"Brightest Day"

New origins
In the 2009–2010 "Brightest Day" storyline, Mera's origin is revisited with new revelations, expanding upon some elements and writing off others as deceptions and lies fed to Aquaman by Mera herself. Instead of being the Queen of Dimension Aqua, Mera is now the older princess of Xebel, a forgotten extradimensional penal colony for an ancient group of separatist Atlanteans, banished behind a sealed portal in the Bermuda Triangle.

Trained since birth, along with her younger sister Siren, Mera was sent by the King of Xebel, who was unable to send more than one soldier at a time through a small fissure in spacetime to the main universe. They were to confront the current King of Atlantis and kill him in retaliation for the exile of their common people. However, the plan backfired when Mera fell truly in love with Arthur, deliberately choosing to keep claiming her cover story as her real past to avoid frictions with him. However, on several occasions, like Aquababy's death, Mera's deep-seated hatred for Atlantis and its royal family was re-ignited, sparking the bouts of apparent insanity and angry lashing at her husband for his "weakness". It is also hinted that Black Manta had a long-lasting feud with Xebel's people; despite Aquaman believing for years to have been the cause of Aquababy's death, Mera still thinks that her son was killed to get back at her birth family.

During one of the several attempts to escape en masse from the Bermuda Triangle portal, the people of Xebel are ordered to capture and experiment on several land-dwellers, including the future Black Manta. During these grueling experiments a young hybrid, son of Black Manta and an unnamed woman, was born. While Mera's father wanted to experiment on the child, using his hybrid nature to escape from the barrier, Mera took pity on little Kaldur'ahm and, adding a new reason of friction between herself and her birth family, kidnapped Kaldur'ahm to give him to a caring family on the surface. Mera didn't meet Kaldur'ahm again for many years, until a now-adolescent Kaldur'ahm was discovered by the Xebel army, forcing Mera to return in his aid.

Present day
Following the "Blackest Night" storyline, Aquaman ponders the mystery of his resurrection, disturbed by the recent events, despite Mera's attempts to comfort him. While cleaning up an oil spill, they are attacked by soldiers from Mera's homeworld led by Siren, who bears a striking resemblance to Mera, who reveals that she was sent to kill him, proceeding to confess her real origins to him.

She also hints that, despite the long-lasting exile of her people, Xebel's soldiers had been enemies of Black Manta himself from a distant time, even preceding the first public appearance of Aquaman, and states that, despite Mera's original mission being a "solo" one, Siren is now backed by the entire "Death Squad", elite Xebel soldiers at the orders of the acting princess. Mera reveals that Siren is her younger sister. After being shown a vision by the Entity, Aquaman tells Mera that he must track down a teenaged boy with an eel tattoo. Upon hearing Arthur's description of the boy's appearance, a shocked Mera says she knows who the boy is, prompting Aquaman's search for the boy himself. The boy, Jackson Hyde, eventually becomes the newest person to bear the name Aqualad.

The New 52 relaunch

In The New 52, the 2011 relaunch and retcon of DC Comics' entire superhero line, a greatly disillusioned Aquaman, distressed by the rejection faced from his fellow Atlanteans and his poor standing as a superhero, often ridiculed because of his shortcomings and less than glamorous superpowers, decides to return to Amnesty Bay. Mera follows him, helping her husband try to find a new place in the world, despite being saddled from the same ill reputation as the almost useless "Aquawoman", and mistakenly believed to be a mermaid by the general public. Mera has difficulty adjusting to society on the outside world and severe problems controlling her anger. She also aids Arthur and The Others in trying to uncover the mystery behind the sinking of Atlantis and fights against Black Manta, who tries to obtain the ancient artifacts of Atlantis.

It is revealed that Mera had been sent by her father, the King of Xebel to assassinate the King of Atlantis. However, after being impressed by Arthur's nobility, and after uncovering a secret message from her late mother encouraging her to find her own path away from Xebel's restrictive society, she falls in love with and marries him.

Following the "Throne of Atlantis" storyline, Mera is approached by the police force to arrest her again for violent assault following an outburst in town. Mera and the police officers discuss civic virtues, and she is confronted by Officer Watson, who knew Aquaman when they were at school. Watson reasons with Mera and tells her to stop being hostile. She also tells her that she needs to respect the law and society on the surface. As Mera concedes, she and the police officers are attacked with the winter storm by the Dead King who demands her to lead him to the Xebel location. The Dead King drags Mera to the Bermuda Triangle and opens the Xebel barrier, but Mera manages to escape from the Dead King. When Mera returns to her previous home of Xebel to warn them, it is revealed that she was betrothed to Nereus, who is the current king of Xebel.

He asks Mera "Where the hell have you been?" Nereus is angered when he discovers Mera is on the side of Atlantis and Aquaman's lover. Mera and Nereus are frozen in ice by the Dead King. Aquaman arrives to free Mera and confronts the Dead King, who turns out to be the first king of Atlantis who plans to rule the Seven Seas once more. During the fight, Mera frees Nereus and Xebel soldiers to help Aquaman against the Dead King, but Nereus and Xebel soldiers bow to the Dead King, claiming that he is the true king of the Seven Seas.

When Mera and Aquaman escape from Xebel soldiers and arrive at Atlantis, it is under attack by Scavenger and his men. Aquaman tells Atlantean to fall back using his physical force ability to summon the Kraken that attacked Scavenger's men. However, Aquaman is unconscious when the Dead King and Xebel soldiers arrive. Aquaman revives with Vulko on the surface world, but Vulko reveals to him that he has been in a coma for six months. Aquaman asks what happened to Mera after six months; Vulko said he saw Mera was facing the Dead King.

Later, Mera is imprisoned by the Dead King and Xebel soldiers are controlling Atlantis. Mera refuses to marry Nereus and warns that she will kill him if she is released. Aquaman arrives to free Mera and the Atlanteans, and they battle the Dead King and Xebel soldiers. When the Dead King is destroyed, Nereus and Xebel soldiers retreat, and Mera reunites with Aquaman and decides to remain in Atlantis. Mera is often left in command of Atlantis while Arthur confronts external threats or attends to his superheroic duties. Initially unpopular, she wins the support of Atlantis' Council of Elders and the respect of the people for her courage and competent handling of domestic issues. She also accompanies Arthur on his quest to find his mother, Atlanna, who is revealed to have faked her death.

When buildings and war machines from Thule, an alternate version of Atlantis in a parallel reality, Arthur leaves Mera in charge of Atlantis while he goes to resolve the crisis. Arthur learns that, as well as the invasion forces, refugees are also crossing over from Thule. Arthur chooses to allow the incursions to continue rescuing as many innocents as possible, even though the incursions are poisoning the seas. This leads to Mera seemingly turning on him and declaring him an enemy of the state. In fact, the "Mera" in charge of Atlantis is revealed to be her sister Siren, who has imprisoned the real Mera. Mera is able to free herself and easily overpower Siren as Arthur is attempting to rescue her. The pair reunite and join the Justice League in rescuing as many refugees from Thule as possible, before closing the connection between the two worlds.

The events of Thule's invasion inspire Arthur to open formal diplomatic relations with the surface. He constructs an Atlantean embassy in his hometown of Amnesty Bay, Massachusetts, and names Mera the ambassador. She proves highly adept in the role, becoming a media darling and a popular liaison with law enforcement.

DC Rebirth

Mera's character is largely unchanged following the DC Rebirth reboot. However, her personal history is altered. Rather than being Aquaman's wife, she is now his fianc but is still Atlantis' ambassador to the surface. Post-Rebirth, Xebel is no longer concealed behind a magical barrier and is accessible from Atlantis. When she was a child, Mera's father took her to view Atlantis from a distance. He told her to see Atlantis for what it could be, not what it was, however, all the young princess felt was anger.

To marry Arthur, Mera is required to spend months in seclusion with the Widowhood, an order of priestesses whose husbands and sons died in service to Atlantis. The widows attempt to divine Mera's future, and foresee that she will be a great queen, yet also that she will doom Atlantis and the surface as the "Fatal Queen" when Arthur dies shortly into his reign and Mera is driven mad with anguish.

Mera stars in a limited series that began in February 2018 and concluded in July 2018 in which she defeats Ocean Master and becomes Queen of Atlantis. Her first crisis as queen is an operation by the Suicide Squad to sink Atlantis, which has temporarily risen above the waves.

During the Drowned Earth event, a trio of alien gods named the Triumvirate who were betrayed and imprisoned by the Atlantean wizard Arion centuries ago attack the Earth with dark waters that turn anyone they touch into mutant fish creatures under the Triumvirate's control. The Triumvirate are aided by Lex Luthor's Legion of Doom, including Arthur's nemesis, Black Manta.

Mera frees Ocean Master from his dungeon, and the two recover the centerpiece of Arion's crown known as the Clarion from a secret chamber. Orm tells Mera of the Tear of Extinction, the weapon Arion used against the alien gods, before being taken by the invaders. With the aid of Superman and the Flash, she heads to Arion's secret tomb, and recovers the Tear, creating a sword of water which can harm the alien gods. The trio is attacked by a wave of mind-controlled superheroes and villains, but rescued by Aquaman and Wonder Woman. Arthur and Mera reunite, and Arthur explains that with the Tear and Poseidon's Trident, they could kill the Triumvirate, but he wishes to try another way. As the group attacks the Triumivrates flagship, Mera realizes that the Clarion has been contaminated with darkness, but that Arthur can restore it to the symbol of hope it was meant to be. Arthur successfully restores the Clarion, which Mera is able to use to psychically reach the Triumvirate, causing them to end hostilities.

However, Black Manta unleashes an alien sea monster known as the Death Kraken upon the Earth, which he is unable to control. Arthur successfully stops the Kraken but appears to die as he does so. Mera takes his place on the Justice League. It is revealed that Mera is pregnant with Arthur's child.

As queen, Mera attempts to improve the lives of the people of the Ninth Tride, Atlantis' lowest district, both physically and socially. She pardons Vulko for his acts of treason and appoints him her chief adviser. Although Vulko loyally carries out her wishes, she is met by reluctance and outright resistance from her other counselors, who accept the considerable inequality of Atlantis as part of the natural order. Mera comes to believe that Atlantis and the other undersea civilization's systems of the absolute monarchy has failed their people, and decides to call a council with her fellow monarchs to dissolve the undersea monarchies, leaving recorded instructions to that effect for Vulko in case she is incapacitated.

Although the Widowhood installed Mera on the throne she frequently comes into conflict with their leader Reverend Mother Cetea, who repeatedly tries to guide Mera into ruling in the manner of a more traditional Atlantean monarch rather than the notoriously independent-minded Queen's own style. She also insists that Mera marry to ensure the succession, yet also refuses to allow Arthur to become king again. Mera declares her intention to marry Vulko, as any other potential suitor would seek to control her. She also stalls by insisting that the royal wedding be meticulously planned to the last detail.

Black Manta destroys an Atlantean historical site to provoke a confrontation with Mera and the recently resurrected Arthur. Mera, along with Arthur, Jackson Hyde, and Arthur's new ally Tristan Maurer successfully fight off Manta, who is equipped with a mecha provided by Lex Luthor. Mera joins her powers with Jackson to create a gigantic, bioelectric powered water construct of herself, destroying the mecha, however, the strain of the immense hydrokinetic power Mera is forced to use puts her in a coma, and she gives birth to her daughter Andy shortly after.

Mera remains comatose for ten months, during which time Vulko, acting as regent, is unable to govern as he lacks legitimacy, being merely Mera's fiancé rather than her husband. Without Mera to force the issue, her counselors neglect the Ninth Tride, currently wracked by a mystery epidemic. This abandonment by the authorities fuels resentment and allows the returned Ocean Master to recruit followers and stir up discontent among the people with impunity. Vulko attempts to carry out Mera's recorded instructions, however, the other monarchs refuse to come to Atlantis unless invited by Mera. Vulko sets a date for him to marry the still unconscious Mera, as the monarchs will be required to attend a royal wedding. The day before the wedding, Mera regains consciousness and orders the entire Windowhood arrested without charge to prevent their interference. At the ceremony, Mera reveals to the assembled monarchs that she is awake and announces her plan to end the monarchies. Orm, present in his capacity as King of Dagon, orders his fleet to attack Atlantis.

Orm and his forces are stopped by Aquaman, assisted by the Justice league and the Sea gods. Following this, Mera finally embraces her daughter, as she and Arthur settle down in Amnesty Bay. Soon afterwards Mera and Arthur marry in the presence of their family and friends, in what was originally planned as a welcome back party for her.

Following the abolition of the monarchy, Arthur and Mera intended to hold themselves apart from Atlantis to allow the city to govern itself, but they were forced to intervene when the Frost King's forces attacked the city during what was intended to be their honeymoon. Arthur journeyed into the city's heating vents to meet with the Fire Trolls who lived in the tunnels below Atlantis, hoping they could be an ally against the Frost King. Originally Mera agreed to stay behind to guard Andy but quickly followed him, arriving in time to save Arthur from a Fire Troll with a hydrokinetic attack. The Trolls were in awe of this and swore loyalty to her. With her army of Fire Trolls, Mera and Arthur defeated the ice creatures attacking Atlantis.

Powers and abilities

As a Xebellian (a sub-race of Atlanteans from Xebel), she shares the common abilities of superhuman strength, speed, durability, and possesses the ability to breathe underwater. While on dry land, she possesses more acute senses that including limited night vision from her enhanced sight and more acute hearing compared to ordinary humans. In addition to her natural physical abilities, she possesses powerful hydrokinetic powers (called aquakinesis), allowing her to control bodies of water, create "hard water" constructs, and drawing water from other forms, including human beings. Her hydrokinetic powers also allow her to sense bodies of water, including what's in them.  According to Corum Rath, she is considered perhaps the most powerful high-functioning aqua-kinetic ever recorded in the history of Atlantis.

In addition to her natural and hydrokinetic abilities, Mera is also an extremely proficient warrior; she is an expert in Atlantean-related martial arts and use of weaponry, being skilled enough to battle Ocean Master in single combat.  Mera was also trained in assassination and is considered a natural, proficient leader.

Weaknesses 
As a natural-born Atlantean, Mera is prone to dehydration at a faster rate compared to ordinary human beings while on the surface. Powerful artifacts and strong users of telekinetic-related abilities (i.e. cryokinesis) can also resist and even negate her aquakinetic powers. Due to her abilities working through telekinetic connections, material that negates telepathic connections also disrupts her hydrokinetic powers. Earlier stories also placed some limits on her abilities such as susceptibility to lead.

Reception
Mera was ranked 81st in Comics Buyer's Guide's "100 Sexiest Women in Comics" list.

In American Comic Book Chronicles: 1960–64, John Wells says of the Silver Age Mera, "Stripped of her abilities for most of [her] first story, Mera initially came off as something of a damsel in distress. That would change when she returned as a series regular with issue #13. To a general audience that still held the average girl and a growing number of teenage boys, a pretty heroine in a green jumpsuit was far more appealing than a magical imp named Quisp."

Other versions

Flashpoint
In the alternate timeline of the 2011 "Flashpoint" storyline, Mera is the Queen of Atlantis and killed by the Amazons at some point. Her death prompted Aquaman to cause Western Europe to sink into the sea, hoping to destroy New Themyscira as well. Mera's death was ordered by Wonder Woman. In a flashback, Mera is shown to attack the Queen of New Themyscira, which at that point was Diana (Wonder Woman), but she was eventually beheaded by Wonder Woman.

Injustice
In Injustice: Gods Among Us, comic book prequel to the video game of the same name, Mera plays a minor role, often appearing and asking her husband Aquaman about Atlantis and their people's safety due to his forced alignment with Superman's One-Earth regime.

DC Bombshells
In DC Bombshells, an alternate history of World War II, Mera and Wonder Woman were childhood friends and were each other's first loves.

In other media

Television
 Queen Mera appears in The Superman/Aquaman Hour of Adventure, voiced by Diane Maddox. The opening narration describes her as "an Atlantean woman".
 Queen Mera appears in Justice League, voiced by Kristin Bauer. Her design is inspired by her Silver Age comics look, but adds elegant touches of regality, such as gold jewelry and transparent green draped fabric as well as a midriff-baring halter.
 Queen Mera appears in Batman: The Brave and the Bold, voiced by Sirena Irwin. This version is not shown to possess her comic counterpart's hydrokinesis. She made a brief cameo as part of Atlantis' royal family in the episode "Evil Under the Sea!", seated next to Aquaman and Orm (Ocean Master). Mera also appears in "Aquaman's Outrageous Adventure!" where she demands her husband take her and Arthur Jr. on a land vacation.
 Queen Mera appears in the final season of Smallville, portrayed by Elena Satine. In this incarnation, she once again is Aquaman's wife. Arthur and Mera discovered that Slade Wilson was building prisons for superheroes following the passing of the Vigilante Registration Act and destroyed one of them. Clark Kent went to confront Arthur about this. However, Queen Mera, deeming him a threat, knocked him aside with her strong hydrokinesis. As Clark and King Arthur went off to investigate Slade's operation further (resulting in Arthur being kidnapped), Mera was confronted by Lois Lane, who was trying to help Clark. At first, Mera deemed Lois a lesser being compared to herself, Arthur, Oliver Queen, and Clark, until Lois managed to help them save Arthur with information on the prisons. Mera managed to rescue Oliver and King Arthur. Later, before leaving town with Arthur, Mera apologized to Lois and admitted that she is a worthy partner of equal standing for someone like Clark.
 Queen Mera appears in the Young Justice, voiced by Kath Soucie. This version, named Mera Nereus, is an instructor at the Conservatory of Sorcery, and also has tentacle-like skin markings that are only visible when using her full power. In the episode "Leviathan Wakes", she becomes the High King of Atlantis at Aquaman's recommendation.
 Queen Mera appears in Aquaman: King of Atlantis, voiced by Gillian Jacobs.

Film

DC Extended Universe

Mera made her live-action film debut in Justice League (2017), portrayed by Amber Heard. Mera is depicted as a warrior, a sorceress, and the daughter of a king. She is shown to be in charge of protecting the Atlantean Mother Box. When Steppenwolf arrives on Earth, he heads to an Atlantean outpost to recover the box. Mera fails to keep the mother box. Aquaman intervenes and in the ensuing fight, Steppenwolf fends them off and escapes via a Boom Tube. After he escapes, Mera encourages Aquaman to pursue him and recover the box, prompting him to join the Justice League.
 Mera also appears in the "Snyder Cut" of the film, where Heard filmed additional scenes during post-production. After the final battle, Aquaman meets her and Vulko again, but decides to return to his father. In a vision that Bruce Wayne receives of the future, Darkseid had enslaved the Earth and personally murdered Aquaman. Mera took up Aquaman's trident and joined Batman's resistance force to seek revenge. Unlike in the theatrical cut and Aquaman, Heard uses a British accent when portraying Mera in this version of the film.
Heard reprised the role in James Wan's Aquaman (2018). She starts off as the betrothed to Orm, being she is the Princess of neighboring Xebel where the film's version of Nereus is her father, while her full name is given as Y'Mera "Mera" Xebella Challa. At the behest of Vulko, she seeks out Arthur Curry to convince him to take his rightful place on the throne. Then she helps him escape his half-brother during his challenge for the throne when things go bad. After hiding from the Atlantis guard inside a humpback whale, the two head to the Sahara as they are searching for Atlan's Trident. The next clue leads them to Sicily, Italy where Mera experiences the Surface world for the first time. Black Manta and the Atlantis guard attack as Arthur and Mera find the second clue. Mera unknowingly steals a boat (she thinks that they are for public use) the Trench attack, but Mera and Arthur are saved by his mother, who had been presumed dead. When they arrive back at Atlantis to stop a war against the surface, she kisses Arthur for the first time and heads off to get her father to side with Aquaman. She succeeds by telling king Nereus that Aquaman is wielding the Trident of Atlan. After Ocean Master is defeated and taken away by the Atlantean guards, Mera stands by Arthur's side as all the soldiers of the Atlantean kingdoms recognize Arthur as their king.

Animation
 Mera briefly appears in Justice League: The Flashpoint Paradox. In a flashback scene of the distorted timeline, she attempted to kill Wonder Woman for having an affair with her husband, only to be killed. Her death served as Aquaman's primary motivation for sinking most of Europe and waging war against the Amazons.
 Mera appears as one of the main characters in Justice League: Throne of Atlantis, voiced by Sumalee Montano. She is an Atlantean and Queen Atlanna's royal guard. In the film, she helps to find and save Arthur Curry before becoming his love interest.
 Mera appears in Lego DC Comics Super Heroes: Aquaman: Rage of Atlantis, voiced by Susan Eisenberg.
 Mera makes a non-speaking cameo appearance in The Death of Superman. She alongside Aquaman and several Atlantean troops investigate the oceans to learn what had killed the Atlanteans who came to intercept a submarine, whose occupants had been killed during Doomsday's attacks.
 Mera makes a non-speaking appearance in Justice League Dark: Apokolips War. She participates in the Justice League's failed attempt to destroy Darkseid which killed most of the League (Aquaman included) and Mera was one of the several members who were converted into cyborg Furies to serve the Apokoliptian ruler. Two years later the Furies battle Superman, Constantine, Raven, Robin, and Etrigan during their second attempt to defeat Darkseid resulting in Etrigan's death but Constantine eventually frees them. After Darkseid's defeat, the remaining League members take refuge at Titans Tower where Mera mourns for Aquaman and witnesses Flash traveling back to reset the timeline. 
 Mera is a major character in DC Super Hero Girls: Legends of Atlantis, voiced by Erica Lindbeck.

Video games
 Mera appears via downloadable content as a playable character in Lego Batman 3: Beyond Gotham.
 Mera is mentioned in Injustice 2 by Aquaman and Harley Quinn, the latter of whom asks whether Aquaman kisses like a fish too, to which the former replies that only Mera knows.
 Mera appears as a playable character in DC Unchained.
 Mera appears in Lego DC Super-Villains. She appears as part of the Aquaman DLC.

Web
 Mera appears starting in season four of DC Super Hero Girls, voiced by Erica Lindbeck.

Literature
Mera is the basis for the character "Blue Bayou" in Catherynne M. Valente's 2017 The Refrigerator Monologues.

References

External links
DCU Guide: Mera 
.

Comics characters introduced in 1963
DC Comics aliens
DC Comics Atlanteans
DC Comics characters who can move at superhuman speeds
DC Comics characters with superhuman strength
DC Comics characters who use magic
DC Comics extraterrestrial superheroes
DC Comics female superheroes
DC Comics martial artists
DC Comics film characters
Fictional characters with water abilities
Fictional characters with superhuman senses
Fictional characters with dimensional travel abilities
Fictional queens
Fictional women soldiers and warriors
Twin characters in comics